William Stowell (March 13, 1885 – November 24, 1919) was an American silent film actor.
 
A handsome actor with matinee idol good looks, Stowell was signed into film in 1909 with IMP (forerunner of Universal Studios), and debuted by starring in the popular hit The Cowboy Millionaire (1909), also starring Tom Mix. Between 1909 and 1919 Stowell starred in 119 silent films, often playing in over 10 films a year.
 
In 1915 he starred in The Great Question alongside actors such as Harold Lockwood with American Studios. In 1916 he starred in The Love Hermit portraying Jack Hillman, and began appearing in a series of Universal features that paired him with Lon Chaney and Dorothy Phillips. Stowell's early death brought the series of adventures to a close.

In 1918 he co-starred with Dorothy Phillips and Erich Von Stroheim in The Heart of Humanity.

In 1919 Universal sent Stowell to the Belgian Congo to scout for filming locations. While en route to Elizabethville Stowell was riding in the caboose car of his train. An out-of-control locomotive engine from another train slammed into Stowell's car, killing him instantly.

Selected filmography
 The Cowboy Millionaire (1909)
 Brown of Harvard (1911)
 The Ex-Convict's Plunge (1913)
 The Buzzard's Shadow (1915)
 The Great Question (1915)
 The Love Hermit (1916)
 The Other Side of the Door (1916)
 Triumph (1917)
 Pay Me! (1917)
 Fighting Mad (1917)
 Bondage (1917)
 The Rescue (1917)
 Fires of Rebellion (1917)
 A Doll's House (1917)
 The Flashlight (1917)
 The Girl in the Checkered Coat (1917)
 Hell Morgan's Girl (1917)
 The Piper's Price (1917)
 The Talk of the Town (1918)
 Broadway Love (1918)
 The Grand Passion (1918)
 The Man in the Moonlight (1919)
Destiny (1919)
 When a Girl Loves (1919)

References

External links

 
 stills of Lon Chaney, Dorothy Phillips, William Stowell in Triumph

1885 births
1919 deaths
American male film actors
Male actors from Boston
American male silent film actors
Railway accident deaths in the Democratic Republic of the Congo
20th-century American male actors